Grigorijs Kuzņecovs (born 1943) is a former Soviet-Latvian football midfielder who played with FK Daugava Rīga from 1967 to 1973.

His first steps in football Kuzņecovs made in the Crimea where he was born - he started with Tavriya Simferopol, then moved to Volyn Lutsk but he made himself really known only when he moved to Daugava Rīga in 1967. Kuzņecovs was good in tackling and ball control, had a good technique, but his weaker side was thinking ahead and taking unexpected decisions. With Daugava he made 213 appearances scoring 19 goals. Later he played with Torpedo Rīga.

References

1943 births
Living people
Soviet footballers
Latvian footballers
Daugava Rīga players
SC Tavriya Simferopol players

Association football midfielders